The Philippine slender gecko (Hemiphyllodactylus insularis) is a species of gecko. It is endemic to the Philippines.

References

Hemiphyllodactylus
Reptiles described in 1918
Endemic fauna of the Philippines
Reptiles of the Philippines
Taxa named by Edward Harrison Taylor